"Sick of Drugs" is a 1996 single by The Wildhearts. The song peaked at #14 on the UK singles chart, the highest chart position achieved by the band. The band played the song on Top of the Pops shortly after its release, but their performance was cut short, prompting frontman Ginger to sing the final line: "If you wanna hear the rest of the song, go and buy the single."

A limited edition CD was available which came with a green mat which when watered sprouted grass.

Track listing
"Sick of Drugs"
"Underkill"
"Bad Time To Be Having A Bad Time"
"Sky Chaser High"

References

The Wildhearts songs
1996 singles
1996 songs
Warner Music Group singles
Song articles with missing songwriters